WOW 1997 is a compilation album of 30 Contemporary Christian music hits that was released on October 29, 1996.  It charted at No. 1 on Billboard's Top Contemporary Christian chart in 1996, and at No. 2 in 1997.  The album reached number 71 in 1996 on the Billboard 200 chart.  It was certified as platinum in 1997 by the Recording Industry Association of America (RIAA).

Track listing

Disc one
"Lord of the Dance" – Steven Curtis Chapman
"Between You and Me" – dc Talk
"All Kinds of People" – Susan Ashton
"Love Song for a Savior" – Jars of Clay
"Melodies from Heaven" – Kirk Franklin & the Family
"I'll Lead You Home" – Michael W. Smith
"Keep the Candle Burning" – Point of Grace
"Love's Been Following You" – Twila Paris
"The Message" – 4Him
"Every Time" – CeCe Winans
"Take Me to Your Leader" – Newsboys
"Under the Influence" – Anointed
"Man After Your Own Heart" – Gary Chapman
"Listen" – Cindy Morgan
"God" – Rebecca St. James

Disc two
"Right Place" – Petra
"Anything" – PFR
"Nothing at All" – Third Day
"Walk on Water" – Audio Adrenaline
"R.I.O.T." – Carman
"More than Gold" – Geoff Moore & the Distance
"True Devotion" – Margaret Becker
"Time to Believe" – Clay Crosse
"Sing Your Praise To The Lord" – Rich Mullins
"Mercy Came Running" – Phillips, Craig & Dean
"After This Day Is Gone" – Bryan Duncan
"After the Rain" – Aaron Jeoffrey
"I Know You Know" – Sierra
"Through It All" – Wayne Watson
"One Drop of Blood" – Ray Boltz

References

External links 
 WOW Hits online

1996 compilation albums
1997